In the Battle of Bolkhov on May 10–11, 1608, the troops of False Dmitry II managed to defeat the army of Tsar Vasily Shuisky.

Prelude 
From the Tsar's side at least 30 thousand soldiers (5 regiments) were assembled, Streltsy, Cossacks, noble cavalry and German mercenaries (from Livonia), under voevody Dmitry Shuisky and Vasily Golitsyn. On the side of the Pretender was only 13 thousand soldiers under the leadership of Lithuanian Prince Roman Rozhinsky, including almost 6.000 Polish-Lithuanian mercenaries.

Battle 
On the first day of battle, the Pretender's cavalry attacked first, consisting of heavy Hussars and Cossack cavalry. The attack was successfully repulsed by the Russian nobleman's cavalry and German mercenaries.

The next day, the frontal attacks of the Polish-Cossack forces were not successful because the Russian leaders placed their troops in a fortified camp. However, a deserter informed the hetman Rozhinsky of the strength of the Russian army, the location of the regiments, and also their unwillingness to fight for Tsar Vasily IV. Rozhinsky moved his reserves into the flank of the Russian army and resorted to cunning, ordering the inclusion of carts in this detachment, putting the battle banners on them, so that Russian soldiers would think that the army of False Dmitri was much larger. This caused confusion in the ranks of government troops, and their front crumbled under attack. The defeated army of Dmitry Shuisky fled.

Aftermath 
Part of the government troops (about 5 thousand) was besieged in Bolkhov, but after artillery bombardment surrendered and, recognizing the impostor as their sovereign, joined his army. False Dmitry II had the opportunity to attack Moscow. Kaluga recognized his power without a fight. The army of False Dmitry II came to Moscow and settled in the Tushino camp.

References 

1608 in Russia
17th-century military history of Russia
1608 in Europe
Bolkhov
History of Oryol Oblast
Conflicts in 1608
Vasili IV of Russia